Farad is a former settlement in Nevada County, California. The Truckee River crosses Farad halfway between Truckee, CA and Reno, NV.

References

Former populated places in California
Former settlements in Nevada County, California